The 2009 SAP Open was a tennis tournament played on indoor hard courts. It was the 121st edition of the SAP Open, and was part of the International Series of the 2009 ATP Tour. It took place at the HP Pavilion in San Jose, California, United States, from February 9 through February 15, 2009.

The singles draw featured ATP No. 6, 2009 Australian Open semi-finalist and 2009 Dubai finalist Andy Roddick, 2009 Australian Open quarterfinalist and 2008 U.S Open quarterfinalist Juan Martín del Potro, Other names include James Blake, Radek Štěpánek, Mardy Fish, Sam Querrey, Igor Kunitsyn and Robby Ginepri.

Entrants

Seeds

*Rankings as of February 9, 2009.

Other entrants
The following players received wildcards into the main draw:

 Lars Poerschke
 Marcos Baghdatis
 John Isner

The following players received entry from the qualifying draw:

 Michael Ryderstedt
 Dominik Meffert
 Todd Widom
 Andrea Stoppini
 Ramón Delgado (as a lucky loser, replacing Guillermo García-López)

Finals

Singles

 Radek Štěpánek defeated  Mardy Fish, 3–6, 6–4, 6–2
It was Štěpánek's second title of the year and 4th of his career.

Doubles

 Tommy Haas /  Radek Štěpánek defeated  Rohan Bopanna /  Jarkko Nieminen 6–2, 6–3

References

External links
Official website
Singles draw
Doubles draw
Qualifying Singles draw

 
SAP Open
SAP Open
SAP Open
SAP Open
SAP Open